{{Heritage Railway |
|name     = Douglas Southern Electric TramwayRaad Yiarn Lectragh Jiass Ghoulish |
|image    = 
|caption  = The course of the tramway
|locale   = Douglas, Isle of Man |
|terminus = Port Soderick|
|linename = Douglas Southern Electric Tramway|
|originalgauge = |
|preservedgauge = |
|era      = |
|owned    = |
|operator = Douglas Southern Electric Tramways Co., Ltd.|
|stations = 4 (Plus Loops)|
|length =  |
|originalopen = 2 September 1896 |
|closed = 28 August 1939 |
|reopen =  |
|
|stageyears = |
|stage =  |
|years = 
|events = 
|routemap=
|routemap_state = collapsed
}}

Douglas Southern Electric Tramway (Manx: Raad Yiarn Lectragh Jiass Ghoulish) was a standard gauge tramway between the top of Douglas Head on the Isle of Man and the nearby resort of Port Soderick. The route ran atop the cliffs and crossed a number of viaducts and bridges.  

Overview

The tramway was opened in 1896 by the New General Traction Company and operated until 1939. It never reopened after the war, and was largely lifted and destroyed by 1955. One of the motor cars was retrieved for preservation at the National Tramway Museum at Crich in Derbyshire, where it resides to this day.

There is little left of the line as it was, save for the castellated entrance to the Marine Drive itself. The tramway's sheds and workshops were located mid-way along the line at Little Ness, together with the power station for generating the electricity but this was filled in and is now a car park. The roadway has been closed for several years owing to a number of serious landslides, but in the 1960s the local authority of Douglas Corporation attempted to rejuvenate the area by introducing a bus service on the coastal route. However, it was short-lived owing to further landslides which made the road unsafe. Today parts of the route can be used by motor traffic, but a stretch north of Little Ness is only open to pedestrians. The route of this railway provides views of the Irish Sea, and forms part of the Isle of Man's coastal footpath Raad ny Foillan'' (Way of the Gull), created in 1986.

There exists a film of a ride on this tramway in 1902 made by Mitchell and Kenyon and available at the film British Film Institute]. The journey has been described as a white knuckle ride.

Locations

References

Tram transport in the Isle of Man
Douglas Southern Electric Tramway